Tommy Chuck Yiu Kwok (born 29 May 1994 in Hong Kong) is a former Hong Kong professional football player who played as a forward. Being praised with his talent and hunger in scoring goals, Chuck ruined his career after returning from Switzerland due to personal affairs.

Club career
In 2009, Chuck signed for Rangers when he was 15. During the 2013–14 season, he scored 7 goals to win the 2013-14 Best Youth Player award.

On 12 January 2016, Chuck scored his first goal of the 2015–16 Hong Kong Premier League campaign in a 2:0 win over Kitchee,

During the 2016–17 season, Chuck led R&F in scoring with seven goals. Despite this, he was not retained at the conclusion of the season.

On 27 June 2017, Chuck signed with Rangers. On 13 December 2017, Chuck was called up in the preliminary Hong Kong squad for the Guangdong-Hong Kong Cup in 2018. He received trial with China League One club Dalian Transcendence in January 2018. On 17 February 2018, it was announced that Chuck had terminated his contract with Rangers following much speculation about a move to the mainland China.

In March 2018, Chuck joined Swiss Challenge League club Chiasso. He left the club again at the end of 2018.

On 28 February 2019, Chuck signed a three month contract with HKPL club Yuen Long. However, his registration was cancelled by the club in April due to personal issues.

Chuck joined 1st division side Wong Tai Sin in the 20-21 season, he played in the first 2 matches for the club before the league was suspended due to another wave of outbreak of the COVID 19 in late 2020.

Personal life
On 1 July 2019, Chuck was arrested by the Hong Kong Police on charges of tax evasion.

On 18 February 2021, Chuck was arrested again, this time on suspicion of illegal debt collection. The police have alleged that both he and his girlfriend have been involved in at least 16 debt collection activities between January and February 2021. The pair was reportedly arrested while splashing red paint outside a flat at Wah Fu Estate.

On 17 June 2021, the Kwun Tong Magistrates' Courts sentenced Chuck to 12 months probation after he pled agreed to guilty to criminal damage.

Honours

Individual
Best Young Player: 2014

References

External links
 
 Chuck Yiu Kwok at HKFA

Hong Kong footballers
Fourway Athletics players
Hong Kong Premier League players
Hong Kong First Division League players
Swiss Challenge League players
1994 births
Living people
Hong Kong international footballers
Metro Gallery FC players
Hong Kong Rangers FC players
R&F (Hong Kong) players
FC Chiasso players
Yuen Long FC players
Hong Kong expatriate footballers
Expatriate footballers in Switzerland
Footballers at the 2014 Asian Games
Association football forwards
Asian Games competitors for Hong Kong